Clavus exasperatus, common name the exasperating turrid, is a species of sea snail, a marine gastropod mollusk in the family Drilliidae.

Description
The size of an adult shell varies between 15 mm and 30 mm. The shell is white, with a broad chestnut band below the periphery. The tuberculations of the periphery are short. There is usually a revolving row of nodules below the middle of the body whorl.

Distribution
This species occurs in the demersal zone of tropical waters in the Indo-Pacific and off the Mascarene Basin and Réunion; also off Papua New Guinea and Australia (Northern Territory, Queensland, Western Australia).

References

 Reeve, L.A. 1843. Monograph of the genus Pleurotoma. pls 1-18 in Reeve, L.A. (ed.). Conchologica Iconica. London : L. Reeve & Co. Vol. 1.
 Adams, H. & Adams, A. 1858. The genera of Recent Mollusca arranged according to their organization. London : John Van Voorst Vol. 3 pls 1-138. 
 Hedley, C. 1909. Mollusca from the Hope Islands, North Queensland. Proceedings of the Linnean Society of New South Wales 34(1): 420-466, pls 36-44
 Cotton, B.C. 1947. Australian Recent and Tertiary Turridae. Adelaide : Field Naturalist's Section of the Royal Society of South Australia. Conchology Club Vol. 4 pp. 1–34. 
 Drivas, J. & M. Jay (1988). Coquillages de La Réunion et de l'île Maurice
 Wells, F.E. 1991. A revision of the Recent Australian species of the turrid genera Clavus, Plagiostropha, and Tylotiella (Mollusca: Gastropoda). Journal of the Malacological Society of Australasia 12: 1-33 
 Wilson, B. 1994. Australian Marine Shells. Prosobranch Gastropods. Kallaroo, WA : Odyssey Publishing Vol. 2 370 pp. 
 Tucker, J.K. 2004 Catalog of recent and fossil turrids (Mollusca: Gastropoda). Zootaxa 682:1-1295.

External links
  Charles Hedley, A revision of the Australian Turridae; Records of the Australian Museum 13 (1922)
 
  Kilburn R.N., Fedosov A. & Kantor Yu.I. (2014) The shallow-water New Caledonia Drilliidae of genus Clavus Montfort, 1810 (Mollusca: Gastropoda: Conoidea). Zootaxa 3818(1): 1-69.

exasperatus
Gastropods described in 1843